Liberty's Kids (stylized on-screen as Liberty's Kids: Est. 1776) is an American animated historical fiction television series produced by DIC Entertainment, and originally aired on PBS Kids from September 2, 2002, to April 4, 2003, with reruns airing on most PBS stations until October 8, 2004.

The series was based on an idea by Kevin O'Donnell and developed for television by Kevin O'Donnell, Robby London, Mike Maliani, and Andy Heyward, initially under the name of Poor Richard's Almanac. It received two Daytime Emmy nominations, in 2003 and 2004, both for Outstanding Performer in an Animated Program (Walter Cronkite, playing Benjamin Franklin). Its purpose is to teach its viewers about the origins of the United States. Like the cartoon mini-series This Is America, Charlie Brown earlier, Liberty's Kids tells of young people in dramas surrounding the major events in the Revolutionary War days.

The show features celebrity voice talents, such as CBS News anchorman Walter Cronkite (as Benjamin Franklin), Sylvester Stallone (as Paul Revere), Ben Stiller (as Thomas Jefferson), Billy Crystal (as John Adams), Annette Bening (as Abigail Adams), Dustin Hoffman (as Benedict Arnold), Michael Douglas (as Patrick Henry), Arnold Schwarzenegger (as Baron von Steuben), Liam Neeson (as John Paul Jones), Whoopi Goldberg (as Deborah Sampson), Charles Shaughnessy (as King George III), Michael York (as Admiral Lord Richard Howe), Ralph Fiennes (as General Lord Charles Cornwallis), and Don Francisco (as Bernardo de Gálvez), who lend credence to characters critical to the forming of a free country, from the Boston Tea Party to the Constitutional Convention.

The episodes run a half-hour, including commercials. During PBS airings, these are replaced by segments that include "The Liberty News Network" or LNN (a newscast delivered by Cronkite summarizing the events of the episode, with each including his trademark sign-off "that's the way it is"), "Mystery Guest" (a guessing game where the kids guess a historical figure, who often is a character in the episode), "Now and Then" (a segment comparing life in the Revolutionary Era and today), and "Continental Cartoons" (a rebus word guessing game). The LNN segments were produced and art directed by designer Mike Bundlie.

Plot 
Benjamin Franklin and four fictional associates of his in their experiences during the American Revolution. Although the series spans 16 years from the Boston Tea Party in 1773 to the ratification of the U.S. Constitution in 1789, no main characters appear to age much, except for Dr. Franklin.

Characters

Fictional characters 
 Sarah Phillips (voiced by Reo Jones) is a bright-eyed red-headed teenage girl from England, Sarah travels to the Thirteen Colonies in 1773 at age 15 in search of her father, Major Phillips, who was last heard exploring the region of Ohio; upon her arrival, she is warmly welcomed by and lives as a guest of Benjamin Franklin. Her mother, Lady Phillips, remains in England and is a good friend to Dr. Franklin. However, with the possibility of a war between the American colonists and the English mother country, she decides that she will become a reporter for Franklin's newspaper in order to offer a more balanced perspective to the press. Sarah believes firmly in the power of words and equal rights for all, and is not afraid to speak her mind. At the start of the series, she is a firm loyalist, which sparks many arguments between her and James. Later in the series, Sarah has a change of heart, and realizes how much she has come to understand the people of the colonies, and ends up supporting the Revolution. Some men know the way to her heart – good manners; when this happens, James can seem almost jealous, although near the end of the series she appears to feel "more than friendship" for James. Throughout the series, Sarah and James grow closer. At the end of the series, her mother, Lady Phillips, joins Sarah and her father in the United States and Sarah hopes to explore more of her adopted country. She is the only character to appear in every episode of the series.
 James Hiller (voiced by Chris Lundquist) is an American teenage colonist who works as an apprentice journalist for Franklin's newspaper. James holds a great deal of respect and admiration for Dr. Franklin and his works, particularly his invention of the lightning rod, as when he was an infant, both his parents died in a fire caused by a lightning strike. Street-smart and impulsive, James pursues the revolution from a slightly one-sided perspective – something that prompts Sarah to counter his views. An apprentice in Franklin's Print Shop, James believes firmly in the American cause and will do almost anything to ensure that the people receive an honest view of what is happening. In the process, he also faces the less positive aspects of the political conflict, which eventually forces his patriotic fervor into a new maturity. He highly values his friends, Sarah and Henri. He can be a little protective of Sarah while he attempts to keep Henri out of trouble, acting somewhat like an older brother figure to Henri. He is very laid-back and is constantly reminded of his bad etiquette and poor table manners by Sarah, toward whom he shows feelings of what might be "more than friendship". At the end of the series, James intends to start his own newspaper, following in the steps of his mentor.
 Henri Richard Maurice Dutoit LeFevbre (voiced by Kathleen Barr) is an energetic, rambunctious French boy, Henri shares a similar tragic story as James. Several years earlier, when he was six years old and still living in France, his parents made an agreement with a merchant for seven years of labor in exchange for passage to North America. However, three weeks later, during the voyage an illness broke out aboard the ship, killing half of those on board, including both Henri's parents. The merchant decided to make Henri his cabin boy and treated him very cruelly, until James and Moses discovered him locked in a cage while collecting a new printer from the merchant. Together they smuggled Henri off the ship and the boy found a home in Benjamin Franklin's workshop. While he speaks French fluently, Dr. Franklin has insisted that Henri learn to speak, read, and write in both English and French. Henri's small size has proved more than useful to Sarah and James, though he has a tendency to land himself in all sorts of trouble while not fully understanding the dangers of the war. His lookout on life is that of a "huge party for his benefit" and he has been labeled a "magnet for trouble". In later episodes, he serves on the drum and bugle corps of the Continental Army. Curious and fearless, the only thing Henri values more than his freedom is finding a family of his own. At the end of the series he returns to France with Marquis de Lafayette, whom he had become close to during the series almost as a son. It is implied that Lafayette adopts Henri as his foster-son.
 Moses (voiced by D. Kevin Williams) was born in Africa, Moses was brought in chains to North America as a slave and sold on the block in Charleston, South Carolina. Because of his ingenuity, Moses learned to read, forge metal, and buy his freedom from his master, thus freeing himself from the slavery of the American south. To keep from being confused for a runaway slave, Moses is required to carry papers proving that he is a free man. He eventually moved to Philadelphia and found work at Dr. Franklin's Print Shop. His brother, Cato, had not been so fortunate but later escaped, joining the British troops as a soldier to earn his freedom. Cato appears again at the end of the series when he does not tell on an African American Patriot spy, James Armistead, whose spying was crucial to the American victory at Yorktown, which ends the war for American independence. Moses looks out for Dr. Franklin's young wards, especially Henri. Like Henri, he values his freedom more than anything. Iron-willed Moses will never allow anyone to strip him of his dignity, despite his or her feelings on race. By working at the Print Shop, Moses hopes to educate children of all colors in the ideals of America so that everyone may one day be free. At the end of the series, Moses reveals a plan to set up a school for free black children, both boys and girls, but only to Dr. Franklin and Marquis de Lafayette. Cato goes to Canada with Mrs. Radcliffe, a British loyalist and friend of Sarah and her mother.

Historical characters depicted

Continental Army, Navy, and American militia 
 George Washington (voiced by Cork Ramer)
 Major General William Alexander
 Colonel Ethan Allen
 Brigadier General George Rogers Clark (voiced by Norman Schwarzkopf)
 Major General Thomas Conway 
 Margaret "Molly" Corbin
 Major General Horatio Gates
 Major General Nathanael Greene (voiced by John Michael Lee)
 Nathan Hale
 Alexander Hamilton (voiced by Andrew Rannells)
 Charles Lee
 Colonel John Jameson – appears in "Benedict Arnold"
 John Paul Jones (voiced by Liam Neeson)
 Tadeusz Kościuszko – a Pole in Continental Army
 Colonel James Livingston
 Colonel John Laurens
 Captain John Parker
 John Paulding – appears in "Benedict Arnold"
 Joseph Plumb Martin (voiced by Aaron Carter)
 Israel Putnam – he appeared in the "Bunker Hill" and "The Turtle" episodes.
 Colonel Joseph Reed
 Deborah Samson aka Robert Shurtleff (voiced by Whoopi Goldberg)
 John Sullivan
 Benjamin Tallmadge – appears in "Benedict Arnold"
 Isaac Van Wart – appears in "Benedict Arnold", no lines
 Baron Friedrich Wilhelm von Steuben (voiced by Arnold Schwarzenegger) – a Prussian officer in the Continental army.
 David Williams – appears in "Benedict Arnold", no lines
 Anthony Wayne
 Udeny Wolf-Hutchinson (voiced by Carl Beck)
 Dr. Joseph Warren
 Samuel Prescott

British Army and Navy 
 John André
 John Burgoyne
 Guy Carleton
 Henry Clinton
 General Lord Charles Cornwallis (voiced by Ralph Fiennes)
 Admiral Lord Richard Howe (voiced by Michael York)
 General William Howe
 Richard Pearson
 Johann Rall – a Hessian officer in British service

French officers and politicians 
 Marquis de Lafayette (voiced by Ben Beck) 
 Comte de Rochambeau
 Johann de Kalb
 Admiral Comte de Grasse
 Comte de Vergennes
 King Louis XVI of France – appears in "Allies at Last", no lines

Spanish Army 
 Bernardo de Gálvez (voiced by Don Francisco)

Native Americans 
 Joseph Brant (voiced by Russell Means)
 Cornstalk (voiced by Russell Means)
 Abraham Nimham

Turncoats and spies 
 Benedict Arnold (voiced by Dustin Hoffman)
 James Armistead
 Edward Bancroft
 John Honeyman
 Paul Wentworth

American family members 
 Abigail Adams, wife of John Adams (voiced by Annette Bening)
 John Quincy Adams, older son of John Adams
 Thomas Adams, younger son of John Adams
 Peggy Shippen, wife of Benedict Arnold (voiced by Maria Shriver)

American politicians 
 John Adams (voiced by Billy Crystal)
 Jonathan L. Austin – appears in "Allies at Last"
 Samuel Adams
 Samuel Chase
 Silas Deane
 Benjamin Franklin (voiced by Walter Cronkite)
 John Hancock
 Patrick Henry (voiced by Michael Douglas)
 John Jay
 Thomas Jefferson (voiced by Ben Stiller)
 Henry Laurens
 Richard Henry Lee
 James Madison (voiced by Warren Buffett)
 Caesar Rodney
 Edward Rutledge
 Luther Martin
 John Dickinson
 Charles Pinckney
 John Witherspoon

British politicians 
 King George III of Great Britain (voiced by Charles Shaughnessy)
 Charles Fox
 Alexander Wedderburn
 Lord North

Other historical figures 
 David Bushnell
 Elizabeth Freeman aka Mum Bett (voiced by Yolanda King)
 James Craik – appears in "Lafayette Arrives", no lines
 William Dawes
 Josiah Franklin – appears in "In Praise of Ben", no lines
 James Franklin
 Moses Michael Hays
 Edward Jenner
 Sybil Ludington (voiced by Kayla Hinkle)
 Thomas Paine
 Paul Revere (voiced by Sylvester Stallone)
 Theodore Sedgwick
 Benjamin West
 Phillis Wheatley

Episodes 
The following table contains all 40 episodes of Liberty's Kids, with links to relevant historical articles.

Development 
The show was originally known as Poor Richard's Almanac when the series was first announced in October 2000.

Broadcast 
The show was originally broadcast by PBS on its PBS Kids block from September 2, 2002, to April 4, 2003, with reruns airing on most PBS stations until October 10, 2004, to make room for PBS Kids GO!

Beginning in September 2004, DIC began to syndicate the series onto their DIC Kids Network block, so that those respective stations that broadcast the block, could fulfill FCC educational and informational requirements.

In 2005, it ran on Spacetoon.

In 2008, it ran on History.

The series also aired on This TV's Cookie Jar Toons block and on CBS' Cookie Jar TV block from 2012 to 2013.

In 2017, it played on Starz Kids & Family, and, until August 2019, regularly aired on Starz Encore Family. Until July 4, 2021, the series only aired as a series-long marathon on Independence Day on Starz Encore Family.

Home media releases 
PBS Home Video released a VHS/DVD boxset of the series in 2003 for educational purposes. The boxset contained 20 VHS's/DVDs which each contained two episodes each. The boxsets also came with resource guides. PBS also released a 6-DVD boxset of the series.

In June 2004, Ten-Strike Home Entertainment released 3 VHS's/DVDs of the series – The Boston Tea Party: The Movie, Give Me Liberty and The First Fourth of July, each containing three episodes, with the former being made in a feature-length format. The DVD version also came with an assortment of bonus features including a character guide, Historical Biographies and DVD-ROM features which are a printable coloring book and a web link. These releases were made for public use. Ten-Strike planned to release three more DVDs, titled Heroes and Traitors, American Battles and Daughters of the American Revolution in September 2004 respectively, but they were unreleased.

In October 2008, Shout! Factory released Liberty's Kids: The Complete Series on DVD in Region 1. The 6-disc box set contains all 40 episodes of the series as well as several bonus features. This release has been discontinued and is out of print as Shout! Factory no longer has the distribution rights to the series.

In July 2013, Mill Creek Entertainment re-released Liberty's Kids: The Complete Series on DVD in a 4-disc set. Each disc contains 10 episodes each. Later in February 2017, Mill Creek Entertainment released Liberty's Kids: The Complete Series: Education Edition on DVD in Region 1. The 3-disc set contains all 40 episodes of the series as well as in-depth study guides for all episodes and activity pages.

See also
 Founding Fathers of the United States
 List of television series and miniseries about the American Revolution
 List of films about the American Revolution

References

External links 

 
 

2000s American animated television series
2002 American television series debuts
2003 American television series endings
American children's animated adventure television series
American children's animated education television series
Animated television series about orphans
Animation based on real people
Cultural depictions of Benedict Arnold
Cultural depictions of Benjamin Franklin
Cultural depictions of George Washington
Cultural depictions of John Adams
Cultural depictions of John Quincy Adams
Cultural depictions of Samuel Adams
Cultural depictions of Gilbert du Motier, Marquis de Lafayette
Cultural depictions of Thomas Jefferson
Cultural depictions of Thomas Paine
Cultural depictions of James Madison
Cultural depictions of James Monroe
Cultural depictions of Alexander Hamilton
Cultural depictions of John Hancock
Cultural depictions of Patrick Henry
Cultural depictions of George III
Cultural depictions of Louis XVI
English-language television shows
Historical television series
PBS Kids shows
PBS original programming
Teen animated television series
Television series about the American Revolution
Television series by DIC Entertainment
Television series by DHX Media